Neoterebra variegata, common name the variegated auger, is a species of sea snail, a marine gastropod mollusk in the family Terebridae, the auger snails.

Description
The length of the shell varies between 25 mm and 100 mm.

Distribution
This species occurs in the Pacific Ocean from Baja California peninsula to Peru; off Galápagos Islands.

References

 Bratcher T. & Cernohorsky W.O. (1987). Living terebras of the world. A monograph of the recent Terebridae of the world. American Malacologists, Melbourne, Florida & Burlington, Massachusetts. 240pp
 Terryn Y. (2007). Terebridae: A Collectors Guide. Conchbooks & NaturalArt. 59pp + plates.

External links
 Griffith, E. & Pidgeon, E. (1833-1834). The Mollusca and Radiata. Vol. 12, In: E. Griffith, [1824−1835, The Animal Kingdom arranged in conformity with its organization, by the Baron Cuvier, [...]. London: Whittaker and Co., viii + 601 pp., 61 pls. [1−138 (Date of publication according to Petit & Coan, 2008: pp 1–192, Mollusca pls. 1−39 - 1833; pp 193–601, pls. Zoophytes 2−20, Mollusca corrected pls. 28*, 36*, 37*, pls. 40-41 - 183 ]
 gastropods.com: Terebra (Variegata-group) variegata
 Fedosov, A. E.; Malcolm, G.; Terryn, Y.; Gorson, J.; Modica, M. V.; Holford, M.; Puillandre, N. (2020). Phylogenetic classification of the family Terebridae (Neogastropoda: Conoidea). Journal of Molluscan Studies

Terebridae
Gastropods described in 1834
Taxa named by John Edward Gray